Atisha Naik is an Indian actress has been in the field of acting since she was 8 years old when she made her debut in a Marathi play, Good Bye Doctor as a child artist. She made her film debut with Mahesh Manjrekar's Hindi film Pran Jaye Par Vachan Na Jaye. Recently, she played an important role of a lady, Sarpanch in the national award-winning film Deool.

She has worked in Marathi serials like Abhalmaya, Madhu Ithe An Chandra Tithe, Dilya Ghari Tu Sukhi Raha, Ghadlay Bighadlay, Fu Bai Fu (Zee Marathi), Sundara Manamadhe Bharli, Ya Gojirwanya Gharat, Ghadge & Suun (Colors Marathi), Bun Maska (Zee Yuva), Mansicha Chitrakar Toh, Pudhcha Paaul, Swapnanchya Palikadale (Star Pravah), etc.

She has also appeared in Hindi serials like Taarak Mehta Ka Ooltah Chashmah, Ek Packet Umeed etc. 

Her Marathi film appearances in Manthan: Ek Amrut Pyala, Bandookya, Salaam and Deool were appreciated by both audience and critics. She has also acted in Hindi feature films like Lafangey Parindey and Wake Up Sid.

Filmography

Television 

Bun Maska
Abhalmaya
Hasa Chakat Fu
Aakrit
Ya Gojirwanya Gharat
Puneri Misal
Pinjara
Dilya Ghari Tu Sukhi Raha
Manasicha Chitrakar To
Fu Bai Fu
Tharar
Ghadalay Bighadalay
Mad Mad Murder
Kahani Main Twist
Pardes Main Mila Koi Apanasa
Crime Patrol
Ssshhhh...Koi Hai
Pudhcha Paaul 
Taarak Mehta Ka Ooltah Chashmah
Ek Packet Umeed
Ghadge & Suun 
Bigg Boss Marathi (season 1) (as a guest)
Sundara Manamadhe Bharli
Swapnanchya Palikadale

Natak / Theatre / Play 
Ashi Hi Shyamchi Aai
Shevgyachya Shenga 
Wada Chirebandi - 9 hours play 
Sakkhe Shejari
Sorry Wrong Number
Sakharam Binder
Gidhade
Suryachi Pille
Varyavarchi Varat
Jaubai Jorat
Vijay Dinanath Chauhan
Dili Supari Baykochi

References

External links

Indian film actresses
Actresses in Hindi cinema
Indian stage actresses
21st-century Indian actresses
Indian television actresses
Actresses in Hindi television
Living people
Year of birth missing (living people)